Science and technology in Asia is varied depending on the country and time. In the past, among Asian civilizations considered particularly notable for their contributions to science and technology were India, China and the West Asian civilizations. Countries such as Japan, South Korea, and Taiwan are recently known for technology, while China and India are also major contributors to science and technology. Other countries are also notable in other scientific fields such as chemical and physical achievements. For the science and technology of various Asian countries and civilizations, see:

East Asia
 History of science and technology in China
 Science and technology of the Han Dynasty
 Science and technology of the Song Dynasty
 Science and technology of the Tang Dynasty
 History of science and technology in the People's Republic of China
 Science and technology in contemporary China
 Science and technology in Japan
 History of science and technology in Japan
 Science and technology in Korea

South Asia
 History of science and technology in the Indian subcontinent
 Science and technology in India
 Science and technology in Bangladesh
 Science and technology in Pakistan

Middle East
 Timeline of science and engineering in the Muslim world
 Science in the medieval Islamic world
 Arab Agricultural Revolution
 List of inventions in the medieval Islamic world
 Science and technology in the Ottoman Empire
 Science and technology in Turkey
 Science and technology in Iran
 Science and technology in Israel

South-east Asia
 Science and technology in Malaysia
 Science and technology in the Philippines

North Asia
 Science and technology in Russia

See also

 Science and technology in Africa
 Science and technology in Europe

References